Gültekin is a Turkish given name for males and a surname. It may refer to:

Given name 
 Gültekin Kaan (born Gültekin Kaan Kaynak), Turkish German musician and singer
 Gültekin Uysal (born 1976), Turkish politician and businessman

Surname 
 Hasret Gültekin (1971–1993), Turkish Alevi musician and poet
 Nurgül Gültekin (born 1976), Turkish stage and film actress; stage name: Nurgül Yeşilçay
 Yusuf Emre Gültekin (born 1993), Turkish football player

Turkish masculine given names
Turkish-language surnames